Abbas El Gamal (born May 30, 1950) is an Egyptian-American electrical engineer, educator and entrepreneur. He is best known for his contributions to network information theory, field-programmable gate arrays (FPGAs), and CMOS imaging sensors and systems. He is the Hitachi America Professor of Engineering at Stanford University. He has founded, co-founded and served on the board of directors and technical advisory boards of several semiconductor, EDA, and biotechnology startup companies.

Biography
He was born on May 30, 1950, in Cairo, Egypt.

Education 
El Gamal received his B.Sc. Honors degree from Cairo University in 1972. From Stanford, he earned an M.S. in electrical engineering in 1975, an M.S. in statistics in 1977 and his Ph.D. in 1978.

Academic career 
El Gamal was an assistant professor in the Department of Electrical Engineering from 1978 to 1980. He has been on the faculty of the Department of Electrical Engineering since 1981. He was director of the Information Systems Laboratory from 2004 to 2009. From 2012 to 2017 he was chair of the Department of Electrical Engineering at Stanford University.

In his primary field, network information theory, El Gamal studies the absolute performance limits of communication and computing networks and develops algorithms and protocols to achieve these limits. He published highly cited papers on several classical problems in the field and co-authored its first textbook, Network Information Theory.

Likewise, he was a pioneer in the development of Field Programmable Gate Arrays (FPGA)—a type of integrated circuit that can be electrically reconfigured to implement differing functions. He holds key patents and wrote several highly cited papers on basic architecture and design of FPGAs and pioneered the use of FPGAs in teaching digital system design.

El Gamal was also a key figure in the development of CMOS image sensors, the technology widely used today in cell phone and digital cameras. He started the industrially funded Programmable Digital Camera project, which helped spur several key innovations in the field and funded several PhD students who became leaders in the image sensor industry and research. He also developed an award-winning course on the topic.

Business 
In 1984, El Gamal joined LSI as director of its newly formed Systems Research Laboratory, which evolved into the company's very successful Consumer Product Division.

In 1986, he cofounded Actel – only the second FPGA company in the world – where he made several key inventions in FPGA architecture and held multiple posts, including that of chief scientist until 1990. Actel was acquired by Microsemi in 2010.

In 1990, he founded Silicon Architects – one of the first silicon IP companies in the world – holding multiple posts, including that of chief technical officer until its acquisition by Synopsys in 1995, where he was a vice president until 1997.

In 1998, El Gamal co-founded Pixim, Inc., a fabless semiconductor company that developed chipsets for security cameras based on the Digital Pixel Sensor technology developed by his group at Stanford. Sony Electronics acquired Pixim in 2012.

In 2011, El Gamal co-founded Inscopix, a neurotech company developing tools to enable monitoring of brain activity in vivo. He serves on its board of directors.

Awards and honors 

 2016 IEEE Richard W. Hamming Medal
 2014 Viterbi Lecture, University of Southern California
 2013 Shannon Memorial Lecture, UCSD
 2013 Member of the National Academy of Engineering
 2012 Claude E. Shannon Award, IEEE Information Theory Society
 2000 Fellow, Institute of Electrical and Electronics Engineers

Bibliography

Books 
Network Information Theory, (Cambridge University Press, 2011) – with Young-Han Kim

Journals 
2011: "Miniaturized integration of a fluorescence microscope," Nature Methods – with K. Ghosh, L. Burns, E. Cocker, A. Nimmerjahn, Y. Ziv, M. Schnitzer

2006: "Throughput-Delay Trade-offs in Wireless Networks," in two parts, IEEE Trans. Inf. Theory – with J. Mammen, B. Prabhakar, and D. Shah

2002: "Energy-efficient Packet Transmission over a Wireless Link," IEEE/ACM Transactions on Networking –with E. Uysal-Biyikoglu and B. Prabhakar

2001: "A 10,000 Frames/s CMOS Digital Pixel Sensor," IEEE Journal of Solid-State Circuits – with S. Kleinfelder, S. Lim, X. Liu

1982: Achievable rates for multiple descriptions – with T. Cover

1979: Capacity theorems for the relay channel – with T. Cover

See also
 Stanford University School of Engineering

References

External links
 Abbas El Gamal Profile at Stanford University

1950 births
American people of Egyptian descent
American electrical engineers
American information theorists
American businesspeople
Living people
Stanford University School of Engineering faculty
Stanford University alumni
Stanford University Department of Electrical Engineering faculty
Members of the United States National Academy of Engineering
Fellow Members of the IEEE
Information theorists